Köselerli is a village in Mut district of Mersin Province, Turkey. It is situated in the Göksu valley and to the west of  the Turkish state highway D.715. The population of Köselerli was 766 as of 2012. The main economic activities of the village are fruit production and dairying.

References

Villages in Mut District